The 2022 Carolina Challenge Cup, officially the Breeze Airways™ Carolina Challenge Cup for sponsorship reasons, will be the 15th edition of the Carolina Challenge Cup, an annual soccer tournament held in Charleston, South Carolina by the Charleston Battery, returning after a two-year hiatus. The tournament will be held from February 12 to 19, 2022, with all matches played at Patriots Point Soccer Complex in Mount Pleasant, South Carolina.

In addition to the Charleston Battery of the USL Championship (USL), three Major League Soccer (MLS) clubs participated: Columbus Crew, Charlotte FC, and Inter Miami, all of Major League Soccer.

The tournament was Charlotte's first competition in front of fans as they lost to Charleston 1-0 in their debut, with Aidan Apodaca scoring the lone goal. Miami would ultimately win the 2022 CCC in their first time participating.

Teams

Matches

Table standings

(C) – Cup Winner

References 

2022
2022 in American soccer
2022 in sports in South Carolina
February 2022 sports events in the United States